= Speed limits in Trinidad and Tobago =

As of October 4, 2018, speed limits in Trinidad and Tobago are:

- Highways, motorways and trunk roads: 80–100 km/h (50–62 mph)
- Main roads and byways: 50–65 km/h (31–40 mph)
- Approaching roundabouts: 40 km/h (25 mph)
- Residential areas: 30 km/h (19 mph)
